The 2012 Sacred Heart Pioneers football team represented Sacred Heart University in the 2012 NCAA Division I FCS football season. They were led by first year interim head coach Mark Nofri and played their home games at Campus Field. They are a member of the Northeast Conference. They finished the season 2–9, 1–7 in NEC play to finish in last place.

Schedule

Source: Schedule

References

Sacred Heart
Sacred Heart Pioneers football seasons
Sacred Heart Pioneers football